FC Augsburg, formed on 1 June 1969 when the BC Augsburg and the football department of TSV Schwaben Augsburg merged, is a German football club from Augsburg, Bavaria.

The main reason behind the merger was the decline of both clubs, BCA having been relegated from professional football in 1967 and Schwaben two years later in 1969. The new club was formed with the aim to make a return to the second division Regionalliga Süd but it took until 1973 to achieve this. FCA had an outstanding season in this league in 1973–74, coming close to promotion to the Bundesliga; widely considered to be the greatest performance by the club in the 20th century.

In the years that followed, the club stagnated and existed in the 2. Bundesliga Süd as a lower table side and was relegated from professional football once more in 1979. After a season in the Bayernliga, it returned but missed the cut-off when the new single-division 2. Bundesliga was formed in 1981.

FCA won the league title in the Bayernliga once more in 1982 and returned to the 2. Bundesliga for one more season, missing survival there by only three goals. A 23-year-long stint in amateur football followed. The club had another good season in 1994, winning the league and taking part in the promotion round to the 2. Bundesliga, but failed. Instead, it gained entry to the re-formed Regionalliga Süd that year.

The club's most difficult moment came in 2000, when it was refused a Regionalliga licence and came close to bankruptcy. It recovered, winning the Bayernliga once more in 2002 and continued an upwards trend when it won the Regionalliga in 2006 to return to professional football, where it plays now.

After a successful 2009–10 season, when the club reached the semi-finals of the German Cup for the first time in its history and came third in the 2. Bundesliga, the team achieved even higher in 2010–11, earning promotion to the Bundesliga, where it finished 14th in its inaugural season. In 2012–13 it set a new Bundesliga record when it managed to avoid relegation despite having only accumulated nine points in the first half of the season. In 2014–15 the club played its most successful Bundesliga season, finishing fifth in the league and qualifying for the UEFA Europa League for the first time.

Key
Key to competitions

 Bundesliga (1. BL) – The top-flight of football in Germany, established in 1963.
 2. Bundesliga (2. BL) – The second division of football in Germany, established in 1974.
 3. Liga (3. L) – The third division of football in Germany, established in 2008.
 Regionalliga Süd (RLS) – The fourth division of football in Germany, established in 1964 and designated as the fourth tier in 2008.
 Bayernliga (OLB/AOLB/ALB) – A current fifth division of football in Germany, established in 1991.
 DFB-Pokal (DFBP) – The premier knockout cup competition in German football, first contested in 1935.
 UEFA Champions League (UCL) – The premier competition in European football since 1955. It went by the name of European Cup until 1992.
 UEFA Europa League (UEL) – The second-tier competition in European football since 1971. It went by the name of UEFA Cup until 2009.

Key to colors and symbols

Key to league record
 Season = The year and article of the season
 Div = Division/level on pyramid
 League = League name
 Pld = Matches played
 W = Matches won
 D = Matches drawn
 L = Matches lost
 GF = Goals for
 GA = Goals against
 GD = Goal difference
 Pts = Points
 Pos. = League position

Key to cup record
 DNE = Did not enter
 DNQ = Did not qualify
 NH = Competition not held or cancelled
 QR = Qualifying round
 PR = Preliminary round
 GS = Group stage
 R1 = First round
 R2 = Second round
 R3 = Third round
 R4 = Fourth round
 R5 = Fifth round
 Ro16 = Round of 16
 QF = Quarter-finals
 SF = Semi-finals
 F = Final
 RU = Runners-up
 W = Winners

Seasons
The club's seasons since 1969:

Notes
A.  Commonly referred to as the Bayernliga.
B.  Two separate leagues under this name existed, the first from 1963 to 1974 and the second from 1994 to 2012.
C.  In 1977–78, both the first and second team of FC Augsburg reached the third round of the German Cup.
D.  In 1973–74, 1979–80, 1981–82 and 1993–94, the club remained unbeaten at home.
E.  League top scorer.
F.  Club was denied a Regionalliga licence and relegated.
G.  Until 1995, two points for a win, thereafter three points.
H.  The club's first-ever game was a qualifying match to the German Cup, held in Augsburg on 30 July 1969, in front of 13,000. FCA lost 3–0 aet against 1. FC Nürnberg.

References

Sources
 kicker Allmanach 1990,  publisher: kicker, published: 1989, 
 Die Bayernliga 1945–1997,  publisher: DSFS, published: 1998
 Augsburger Fussball-Geschichte  author: Horst Eckert & Werner Klinger, published: 2007,

External links
 FC Augsburg website

FC Augsburg
Augsburg, Fc
Augsburg, Fc